Valentina Arrighetti (born January 26, 1985, Genoa) is an Italian professional volleyball player. She plays for Italy women's national volleyball team as a middle blocker, as well as playing at club level for Volley Bergamo. She has competed in the 2012 Summer Olympics.

Career
Arrighetti played with her national team at the 2014 World Championship. There her team ended up in fourth place after losing 2–3 to Brazil the bronze medal match.

Clubs
  Club Italia (2000–2002)
  VC Padova (2002–2003)
  Figurella Firenze (2003–2004)
  Caoduro Cavazzale (2004–2005)
  Volley Vicenza (2005–2007)
  Volley Bergamo (2007–2012)
  Busto Arsizio (2012–2014)
  Lokomotiv Baku (2014–2015)
  Imoco Conegliano (2015–2016)
  Savino Del Bene Scandicci (2016–2018)
  Pomì Casalmaggiore (2018–)

Awards

Clubs
 2008 Italian Supercup— Runner-Up, with Volley Bergamo
 2008 Italian Cup— Champions, with Volley Bergamo
 2008–09 CEV Champions League— Champions, with Volley Bergamo
 2009–10 CEV Champions League— Champions, with Volley Bergamo
 2010 Italian Cup— Runner-Up, with Volley Bergamo
 2010 FIVB Club World Championship— Bronze medal, with Volley Bergamo
 2010–11 Italian Championship -  Champion, with Volley Bergamo
 2011 Italian Supercup -  Champions, with Volley Bergamo
 2011 Italian Cup— Runner-Up, with Volley Bergamo
 2012 Italian Supercup -  Champions, with Yamamay Busto Arsizio
 2012–13 CEV Champions League -  Bronze medal, with Yamamay Busto Arsizio
 2013–14 Italian Championship -  Runner-Up, with Yamamay Busto Arsizio
 2014–15 Azerbaijan Championship -  Runner-Up, with Lokomotiv Baku

References

1985 births
Italian women's volleyball players
Living people
Sportspeople from Genoa
Olympic volleyball players of Italy
Volleyball players at the 2012 Summer Olympics
Universiade medalists in volleyball
Competitors at the 2013 Mediterranean Games
Mediterranean Games gold medalists for Italy
Mediterranean Games medalists in volleyball
LGBT volleyball players
Mediterranean Games bronze medalists for Italy
Universiade gold medalists for Italy
Medalists at the 2009 Summer Universiade
Serie A1 (women's volleyball) players
20th-century Italian women
21st-century Italian women